Garry Gordon Cooper (born 21 January 1938) is a retired airline captain and served as a fighter pilot in the Royal Australian Air Force (RAAF) attaining the rank of flight lieutenant. Cooper served on assignment with United States Air Force (USAF) as a Forward Air Controller  (FAC) in South Vietnam. Whilst working as a FAC in 1968, he was assigned to support the US Army's 9th Infantry Division. For his actions in Vietnam, Cooper was presented the USAF Air Force Cross which is awarded for acts of extraordinary heroism.

Early life 
Garry Cooper was born on 21 January 1938 in Adelaide, South Australia. His basic education was at various primary schools around Adelaide and he matriculated from the School of Mines and Industries. Postgraduate, he completed a Diploma in Aeronautical Engineering. Cooper gained his Silver "C" glider pilot's licence at the age of sixteen before taking up powered flying. At the age of nineteen, Cooper gained his commercial pilot licence and obtained employment with the Flying Doctor Service in Central Australia. He subsequently gained employment with Gibbes Sepik Airways in New Guinea where he flew the Norseman UC-64A, Junkers JU52, de Havilland DH84 and various Cessna aircraft. After flying in New Guinea for three years, Cooper was selected to start pilot training with the Royal Australian Air Force (RAAF).

Royal Australian Air Force pilot 
Cooper joined the RAAF on 11 March 1960 to commence pilot training on No. 39 Pilots’ Course with twenty other trainee pilots. Only eleven passed the course. Upon graduation, he received the Most Proficient Pilot award.

After graduation and gaining his Wings, Cooper was first posted to the School of Air Navigation flying the Dakota C-47, Canberra, Vampire and Winjeel aircraft. This tour was interrupted with two tours to Antarctica flying the Beaver DHC-2 on floats and skis from the Danish ship Thala Dan.

In 1962 Cooper was posted to fly F-86 Sabre fighter aircraft with an operational tour in Thailand, Borneo and Malaysia. During one mission operating out of RAAF Butterworth, Malaysia on 10 April 1964, Cooper experienced an engine fire indication in his single-engine Sabre. After shutting the engine down and being too far away to glide back to the airfield at Butterworth, he conducted a safe 'glide landing' at Bayan Lapas on the island of Penang. On 3 January 1966, Cooper commenced his Mirage III fighter conversion course on No.5 Mirage Course at No.2 Operational Conversion Unit (2OCU). The Mirage had only started in RAAF service in October 1964 and was the first Australian fighter jet capable of flying at speeds over Mach 2. In May 1966, Cooper experienced an engine flameout in a Mirage after takeoff at  doing 420Kts, after the engine ingested a bird. Being a single-engine fighter jet, Cooper flew the Mirage like a glider and landed on an abandoned war-time airstrip at Tomago, New South Wales without damaging the aircraft. The Mirage was towed back to RAAF Base Williamtown via the local roads which took 14 hours.

Cooper participated in some developmental testing for the Mirage III where he evaluated flying with full pressure (space) suits.

Vietnam War - Forward Air Controller (FAC) 
Gooper was posted to South Vietnam to serve as a Forward Air Controller (FAC) with the United States Air Force (USAF) from March to October 1968. Although he was an Australian fighter pilot, he served within a USAF unit, the 19th Tactical Air Support Squadron (TASS). In this FAC role, where the overall mission is to support the Army, Cooper was assigned to support the 3rd Brigade, 9th Infantry Division, US Army under the command of Major General Julian Ewell. During his tour in South Vietnam, Cooper completed 620 hours of combat flying in 323 combat missions. Between 1967 and 1971, 36 RAAF fighter pilots served as FAC pilots in Vietnam with the USAF.

Upon arrival in South Vietnam, he was assigned the callsign 'Tamale 35' and would perform his FAC duties in the O-1 Bird Dog. Initially based in Tân An, 40 km southwest of Saigon, due to increased security risks he would later be relocated to Đồng Tâm Base Camp, 67 km southwest of Saigon on the Mekong River.

After his FAC training, Cooper was required to perform his missions during the height of the Vietnam War which saw some of the most intense operational periods, notably the May Offensive or Mini-Tet of 1968. During the period 9–11 May, Cooper was flying around-the-clock missions at any time of day, typically for 3 to 4 hours in duration. On 11 May, Cooper had been awake for 19 1/2 hours, during which time he had been flying for 13 hours of which five of those hours were spent evading anti-aircraft fire during his missions.

Military awards 

FLTLT Garry Cooper is the most highly decorated RAAF pilot to have served in the Vietnam War.

During his combat tour, Cooper's highest award was the USAF Air Force Cross which he received twice. The Air Force Cross is the second-highest US award to the Medal of Honor. Since the inception of the US Air Force Cross in 1960, only ~200 have been awarded. Cooper is the only non-US citizen to have been presented this award for his extraordinary heroism. Cooper had a special commemoration ceremony of this achievement at the Evans Head Returned and Services League (RSL) in New South Wales, Australia on 4 December 2021. The Air Force Cross is the Air Force's second-highest award for valor. Only the Medal of Honor ranks higher in order of precedence. It shares this position with the Army's Distinguished Service Cross and the Navy Cross.Cooper's second USAF Air Force Cross award citation reads, “.... for extraordinary heroism in military operations against an opposing armed force as a Forward Air Controller attached as an Air Liaison Officer to the 3rd Brigade, 9th Infantry Division, (US Army), on 18 August 1968 in the Republic of Vietnam. On that date, after being shot down in an OH-23 observation helicopter, Flight Lieutenant Cooper rescued a badly wounded Brigade Commander from the wreckage under extremely heavy automatic weapons fire. Although wounded himself, but with complete disregard of his own safety, he carried the Colonel to a protected area where he fought off several attempts to over-run them killing ten enemy soldiers at close range. During the helicopter rescue next day, he killed a further two enemy with his empty AR-15. Flight Lieutenant Cooper was solely responsible with the saving of Colonel Archer under over-whelming odds. Through his extraordinary heroism, superb airmanship and aggressiveness in the face of the enemy, Flight Lieutenant Cooper reflected the highest credit upon himself and the United States Air Force”.
Cooper is also one of only a few RAAF pilots to be awarded the Air Force Ground Combat Badge.

Summary of awards:

Foreign awards (United States)
 Air Force Cross (the only non-US Citizen recipient and one of only 4 other multiple AFC recipients in history)
 Silver Star
 Distinguished Flying Cross(3 with "V" for Valor)
 Bronze Star Medal (2, including 1 with "V")
 Purple Heart (2)
 Air Medal (15, including 2 with "V")
 Army Commendation Medal (2, including 1 with "V")
 Antarctica Service Medal
 US Presidential Unit Citation
 US Army Valorous Unit Award
 US Army Meritorious Unit Commendation

Foreign awards (Republic of Vietnam)
 Republic of Vietnam Campaign Medal
 Republic of Vietnam Gallantry Cross (with Silver Star)
 Republic of Vietnam Gallantry Cross (with Palm)
 Republic of Vietnam Wound Medal
 Vietnam Armed Forces Honor Medal (1st Class)
 Republic of Vietnam Gallantry Cross (with Palm Unit Citation)
 Republic of Vietnam Civil Actions Medal Unit Citation (US Army) 
Foreign awards (Malaysia)

 Pingat Jasa Malaysia Medal

Australian / British Imperial Awards

 Distinguished Flying Cross
 Australian Active Service Medal (1945-1975) (Vietnam and Malaysia)
 General Service Medal (1962) (Borneo and Malay Peninsula)
 Vietnam Medal
 Australian Service Medal (1945-1975) (Thailand and Thai-Malay)
 Australian Defence Medal
 Ground Combat Badge

<div align="left">

Author - 'Sock it to 'em Baby' 
With co-author Robert Hillier, Garry Cooper wrote a book about his Vietnam experience in 1968. In 2006 the book was published under the title, 'Sock it to 'em Baby - Forward Air Controller in Vietnam'.

Airline career 

After returning from Vietnam, Cooper left the RAAF and took up employment as a co-pilot with Cathay Pacific Airways in Hong Kong flying Convair 880 aircraft. Due to the rapid expansion of the airline, it took less than eighteen months for him to become a captain. With Cathay Pacific, Cooper advanced through the Boeing 707 and the Lockheed L1011 aircraft. After ten years in Hong Kong, Cooper then gained employment with Saudi Arabian Airlines as an L1011 Check Captain. Following two years in Jeddah, he was offered employment with Kerry Packer flying his Learjet 35 around Australia on VIP operations carrying such dignitaries as Princess Diana and other world leaders. After several years, Cooper resumed flying as an international airline captain with Park Aviation flying Boeing 707 and Boeing 747 aircraft. Park Aviation had crews and aircraft leased out to Lufthansa in Frankfurt, Caribbean Airlines in Paris and Cargolux in Luxembourg, to mention a few. In 1980 Cooper received a letter of commendation from King Hussein of Jordan for landing a Boeing 707 on one engine after losing three engines on takeoff from Dhahran, saving 116 passengers and crew. Then in 1989 he landed a Boeing 747 at Martinique with 450 passengers and crew during Hurricane Hugo in wind speeds of 200 km/h. Finally, Cooper returned to Australia gaining employment with Ansett Airlines flying Boeing 767 and Boeing 747 aircraft. As the post-traumatic stress disorder (PTSD) he had acquired from his Vietnam service became advanced, Cooper took retirement after accumulating over 25,000 hours of flying. In his retirement, Cooper spent time flying various warbirds at airshows which he still does today at the age of 84. Cooper was once the owner of a replica Japanese Zero fighter warbird, which was based on a modified T-6 Harvard. This was the same aircraft used in the 1970 war movie, Tora! Tora! Tora! which dramatised the Japanese attack on Pearl Harbor in 1941. Cooper performed a simulated attack display in the 'Zero' during the 2005 Australian International Airshow at the Avalon Airshow as part of the 60-year commemoration since World War 2. Cooper can be seen here, taxiing the Zero at the Avalon Airshow, just before taking off for the display.

References 

1938 births
Living people
Royal Australian Air Force airmen
Australian military personnel of the Vietnam War
People from Adelaide